Charles Fitzroy Doll JP, FRIBA (1850–1929), was an English architect of the Victorian and Edwardian eras who specialised in designing hotels. He also designed the dining room on the RMS Titanic, which was based on his design for that in the Hotel Russell in Bloomsbury.

Doll was educated in Germany, and on his return to Britain he trained as an architect under Sir Matthew Digby Wyatt. Under Wyatt he was involved in designing the India Office in London, a project he worked on from 1866 to 1868. In 1885 Doll was appointed Surveyor to the Bedford Estates in Bloomsbury and Covent Garden in London. In 1898 he designed the Hotel Russell, which is distinctively clad in decorative thé-au-lait ("tea with milk") terracotta, and which was based on the Château de Madrid on the Bois de Boulogne in Paris. Doll engaged the sculptor Henry Charles Fehr to model the four life-size statues of British Queens, who look down from above the main front entrance. The hotel's restaurant, until recently named Fitzroy Doll's, is said to be almost identical to the RMS Titanic's dining room which he also designed.

Later, Doll designed the Imperial Hotel in Russell Square, which was described by Pevsner as a 'vicious mixture of Art Nouveau Gothic and Art Nouveau Tudor'. It was demolished in 1966 and replaced by a contemporary, brutalist building designed by George Anthony Wilson Brandeth. In 1907 Doll designed the Flemish French-Gothic terrace of shops with apartments over them in Torrington Place.

Doll married Emily Francis Tyler, the daughter of William George Bygrave Tyler and Elizabeth Emily Mackinnon, on 26 August 1879. Their five children included Christian Charles Tyler Doll, who inherited his father's architectural practice and who was involved in the reconstruction of the grand staircase of the Palace of King Minos at Knossos in Crete.

A member of Holborn Borough Council, he served as Mayor of Holborn in 1904–1905 and 1912–1913.

Charles Fitzroy Doll lived at Hadham Towers in Much Hadham in Hertfordshire, where he was a Justice of the Peace. He died in 1929 aged 79.

References

Reference bibliography

External links
Doll on the British Listed Buildings website
Doll on the Victorian Web

1850 births
1929 deaths
Architects from London
Members of Holborn Metropolitan Borough Council
Mayors of places in Greater London
Fellows of the Royal Institute of British Architects
British expatriates in Germany